The 1939–40 FA Cup was an abandoned season of the world's oldest football cup competition, the Football Association Challenge Cup, commonly known as the FA Cup. The competition began as the 65th season of the competition, but was abandoned after just the first round of qualifying matches, due to the start of World War II.

Suspension
The 1939–40 FA Cup began on 2 September 1939, the day after Germany had invaded Poland. On 3 September the United Kingdom declared war with Germany and its allies. The FA suspended the FA Cup on 7 September, until further notice; on 21 September it was announced that all organised football was cancelled for the duration of the war, with only friendly and regional competitions permitted. All results to date in the 1939-40 season were declared null and void.

The Football League War Cup began in October 1939. Organised by the Football League, this was the only national-level competition during the war. Alongside this, the Wartime League or regionalised competitions provided regular football for players and fans during the war.

Extra-Preliminary Round
62 ties were scheduled for 2 September 1939. The results of several matches are missing, but it is not known if these were simply not played, or if the results went unrecorded as it quickly became apparent that the competition would not be continued.

Of the teams involved, this was the only FA Cup appearance for Holiday's Sports, Cheadle, Dagenham Town and Esso. Norwich Electricity Works withdrew before playing a game, in what would have otherwise been their only appearance.

References
General
Official site; fixtures and results service at TheFA.com

Specific

FA Cup seasons
Fa Cup
FA